Gerard Reilly is a Scottish former footballer who played as a goalkeeper.

Reilly grew up in St Marys, Dundee. He played junior football with Broughty Athletic before joining Dundee United in August 1969. He was immediately called up to play for the reserve team as cover for Hamish McAlpine, who had a long-term injury. On 15 September 1969, Reilly was named as a substitute for Dundee United's Inter-Cities Fairs Cup tie against Newcastle United. Aged 16 and having never even watched the first team play before, Reilly made his senior debut after 72 minutes of the match, replacing the injured Donald Mackay. This proved to be his only first team appearance for the club, and he was released in May 1970 following McAlpine's return to fitness.

After a brief spell back at Broughty Athletic, Reilly joined Montrose, making his Scottish Football League (SFL) debut against Clydebank on 12 September 1970. He then began the 1971–72 season with Forfar Athletic before joining Inverness Thistle, where he twice won the Highland League title. He then returned to the SFL with Brechin City and also played in junior football with Dundee North End before rejoining Inverness Thistle in 1975.

Reilly was released by Inverness Thistle in 1976 and returned to Dundee North End. He was named as substitute goalkeeper for the Scotland junior representative team to play a Republic of Ireland XI in September 1977. He had another spell with Brechin, as second-choice goalkeeper, during 1978–79 before being released at the season's end. He once again returned to junior football in Dundee, joining Lochee United.

References

Year of birth missing (living people)
Living people
Scottish footballers
Association football goalkeepers
Footballers from Dundee
Scottish Football League players
Scottish Junior Football Association players
Highland Football League players
Broughty Athletic F.C. players
Dundee United F.C. players
Montrose F.C. players
Forfar Athletic F.C. players
Inverness Thistle F.C. players
Brechin City F.C. players
Dundee North End F.C. players
Lochee United F.C. players
Scotland junior international footballers